Julia Kasper is a New Zealand entomologist specialising in Diptera. As at 2022 she is the lead invertebrate curator at New Zealand's national museum, Te Papa. As part of her work Kasper is assisting with a citizen science project informing a national mosquito census.  Kasper has previously worked as the principal entomologist at the New Zealand Biosecure Laboratory. She has also undertaken work in forensic entomology assisting the New Zealand police and coroners with cases. Prior to living in New Zealand she worked at the Natural History Museum, Berlin.  Kasper obtained her doctorate at Humboldt University of Berlin in 2013.

She is a member of the New Zealand Entomological Society and as at 2022 serves as the President of the Wellington branch of that society.

Works

Some publications by Kasper include:

References
 

 

New Zealand entomologists
21st-century New Zealand scientists
Living people
Humboldt University of Berlin alumni
People associated with the Museum of New Zealand Te Papa Tongarewa
New Zealand women scientists
Women entomologists
Year of birth missing (living people)
New Zealand women curators